Dianna Melrose (born 24 June 1952 in Bulawayo, Southern Rhodesia (now Zimbabwe)) is a British diplomat who has served as the British High Commissioner to Tanzania and as the British Ambassador to Cuba.

Career

Dianna Patricia Melrose was educated at St Catherine's School, Bramley, King's College London (BA, Spanish & French) and the Institute of Latin American Studies, University of London. She worked as a Spanish interpreter in the City of London, then briefly for the British Council, before joining Oxfam in 1980. She was Policy Director of Oxfam GB, 1993–99. She then joined the Foreign and Commonwealth Office (FCO) as Deputy Head, then Head, of its Policy Planning Staff. She was seconded to the Department for International Development (DFID) in 2002, first as head of its Extractive Industries Unit (an initiative by Prime Minister Tony Blair aimed at ensuring that the people of oil-, gas- and minerals-producing countries benefit from the revenues) and then as head of DFID's International Trade Department. In 2006 she returned to the FCO as head of its EU Enlargement and Southeast Europe group before being posted as Ambassador to Cuba in 2008. She left Cuba in July 2012 and was appointed High Commissioner to Tanzania from February 2013.

Oxfam

The Great Health Robbery: Baby Milk and Medicines in Yemen, Oxfam, Oxford, 1981. 
Bitter Pills: Medicines and the Third World Poor, Oxfam, Oxford, 1982. 
 In 1984, Health Action International produced a video, Hard to Swallow, in collaboration with Oxfam about the experiences of Melrose of pharmaceutical sales rep practices in Peru.
Nicaragua: The threat of a good example?, Oxfam, Oxford, 1985.

References

MELROSE, Dianna Patricia, Who's Who 2014, A & C Black, 201; online edn, Oxford University Press, Dec 2013
Dianna Patricia Melrose, gov.uk
Interview with Dianna Melrose, UK ambassador to Cuba, International Journal of Cuban Studies (Online), ISSN 1756-347X, 27 June 2009

1952 births
Living people
People educated at St Catherine's School, Bramley
People from Bulawayo
Alumni of King's College London
Oxfam people
British women ambassadors
Ambassadors of the United Kingdom to Cuba
High Commissioners of the United Kingdom to Tanzania
Rhodesian emigrants to the United Kingdom